"Island Girl" is a 1975 song by English musician Elton John. It was written by John and his songwriting collaborator Bernie Taupin and released as the first single from the album Rock of the Westies (1975). It reached number one for three weeks on the Billboard Hot 100 in the U.S., selling over one million copies, and also reached the top twenty in Canada, New Zealand, Australia and the UK.

John has not performed the song in over 30 years. While no official reason has been given, Andy Greene of Rolling Stone surmises it is due in part to controversial lyrics about a Jamaican prostitute in New York City and a Jamaican man who wants to take her back to Jamaica.

Background
The single's B-side was "Sugar on the Floor", written by Kiki Dee, who would go on to duet with John on a number of occasions, most notably on their chart-topping 1976 single, "Don't Go Breaking My Heart".

Personnel
 Ray Cooper – congas, tambourine, marimba
 Kiki Dee – backing vocals
 James Newton Howard – ARP synthesizer, Mellotron solo
 Davey Johnstone – Ovation guitar, slide electric guitars, banjo, backing vocals
 Elton John – piano, lead vocal, backing vocals (credited as "Ann Orson")
 Kenny Passarelli – bass, backing vocals
 Roger Pope – drums
 Caleb Quaye – acoustic guitar, backing vocals

Release
The song entered the Billboard Hot 100 on 11 October 1975 at number 49, and reaching the top in four weeks.

The week of 4 October 1975, the week before the "Island Girl" entered the charts, marked the first week in over two years in which Elton John did not have a single on the Billboard Hot 100. Billboards "Inside Track" column reported it as follows: "This week is the first time since August 1973 that Elton John hasn't had a single on the Billboard Hot 100. If Rocket had shipped the upcoming 'Island Girl' a few days earlier, Elton would still be in the running to beat Pat Boone's all-time record of just over four years on the charts."

The song which "Island Girl" replaced at number one was "Bad Blood", by Neil Sedaka. Elton had provided uncredited backing and duetting vocals on this collaboration.

Upon the single release, Record World said "Tropically splendid Elton and Bernie entering the RW charts at 42 this week...need we say more?"

Chart performance

Weekly charts

Year-end charts

All-time charts

Certifications

References

External links 
 

1975 singles
Elton John songs
Billboard Hot 100 number-one singles
Cashbox number-one singles
Disco songs
Songs with music by Elton John
Songs with lyrics by Bernie Taupin
Song recordings produced by Gus Dudgeon
1975 songs
MCA Records singles
DJM Records singles
Songs about prostitutes
Songs about islands
Songs about New York City